Several ships of the Royal Norwegian Navy have borne the name HNoMS Brann or Brand (archaic spelling):

  was a  launched in 1898, captured by the Germans in 1940, returned in 1945 and scrapped in 1946.
  was a former German E-boat (ex-S-303) which was commissioned into the Royal Norwegian Navy in 1947 and decommissioned in 1951.
  was a  fast patrol boat built in 1967 and decommissioned in 1990.

References

Royal Norwegian Navy ship names